The Most Admirable Order of the Direkgunabhorn was established by King Bhumibol Adulyadej (Rama IX) on 22 July 1991 (B.E. 2534) to be bestowed upon those who have rendered devotional services to the Kingdom of Thailand. The title Direkgunabhorn (ดิเรกคุณาภรณ์, also spelled Tirekgunabhorn) roughly translates as "Noble Order of Abundance and Quality".

Classes
The Order consists of seven classes. Originally, the ribbon for each class was the same, with no device to distinguish the different level. On 31 January 2538 B.E. (1995 CE), the regulations were amended to include a device on the ribbon distinguishing the class.

First class
 Knight Grand Cross of the Most Admirable Order of Tirekgunabhorn
Insignia: A pendant, star and sash (the insignia for women is the same as for men, but of a smaller size)
Pendant: The pendant consists of a circular disc enamelled red, superimposed by a representation of a Garuda in gold. The central piece is surrounded by a silver band with eight silver rays and eight gold rays. The whole piece is topped with a gold crown and a starburst. The reverse is of gold disc, with the Royal Cyphers of King Rama IX enamelled in white.
Sash: The pendant is suspended from a green sash 10 cm wide, with red, white and yellow trims, to wear over the right shoulder to the left hip.
Star: The star is similar to the pendant, with a gilded crown and insignia on the uppermost arm of the star. A gold band with eight silver rays and eight gold rays surrounds the central disc. The back of the star is similar to that of the pendant. The star is worn on the left chest.

Second class
 Knight Commander of the Most Admirable Order of Tirekgunabhorn
Insignia: A pendant, star and silk band (the insignia for women is the same as for men, but of a smaller size)
Pendant: The pendant consists of a circular disc enamelled red, superimposed by a representation of a Garuda in gold. The central disc is surrounded by a silver band with eight silver rays and eight gold rays. The reverse is a gold disc, with the Royal Cyphers of King Rama IX enamelled in white. The whole piece is topped with a gold crown and a starburst.
Silk band: The pendant is attached onto a green silk band 4 cm wide, with red, white and yellow trims, to wear as collar. For women, it is worn on the left chest.
Star: The star is similar to the pendant, with a gilded crown and insignia on the uppermost arm of the star. The gold band with eight silver rays and eight gold rays surrounds the central disc.

Third class
 Commander of the Most Admirable Order of Tirekgunabhorn 	  	 
Insignia: A pendant only (the insignia for women is the same as for men, but of a smaller size)
Pendant: The pendant is similar to that for the Knight Commander, attached onto a silk band 4 cm wide, worn as a collar. For women, the pendant is worn on the front left shoulder.

Fourth class
 Companion of the Most Admirable Order of Tirekgunabhorn 	
Insignia: A pendant only.
Pendant: The pendant is similar to that for the Commander, but is a smaller size with an additional silk rosette. It is attached onto a small silk band, and worn on the left chest. For women the pendant is attached to a silk ribbon with an additional rosette, and worn on the front left shoulder.

Fifth class
 Member of the Most Admirable Order of Tirekgunabhorn 	  	
Insignia: A pendant only.
Pendant: The pendant is similar to that for the Companion, without the silk rosette.

Sixth class
 The Gold Medal of the Tirekgunabhorn
Insignia: A gold medal, with a Garuda in the centre, surrounded with eight lotus leaves and topped with a gold crown, starburst and insignia. The reverse is engraved with the Royal Cyphers of King Rama IX.

Seventh class
 The Silver Medal of the Tirekgunabhorn
Insignia: A silver medal, of the same design as the gold medal.

Eligibility
Membership of the order can be gained via either "Devotional Service to the Kingdom", or by donation.

Service
Devotional service to the kingdom is deemed to be met via the following criteria:
Five years of devotional service to the kingdom, from the last conferment.
Outstanding service to the state, religion, and the people.
Act of bravery for the state, religion, and the people.
The first decoration to be conferred is the silver medal or Companion, in case of extraordinary service.

A deemed person may request the Silver Medal of the Direkgunabhorn be issued. Decorations of higher class can be attained through further years of excellent service, until the Knight Grand Cross class is reached. Deemed persons include:
Person of Other Nationalities
can attain Member and Companion
Sportsmen (Olympics, World Games, Asian Games, Asian Championship)
can attain Silver Medal to Companion
Private School Personnel
can attain Member and Companion
Private University Personnel
can attain Silver Medal to Knight Commander
Researchers, Scientists, National Artists
can attain Companion

Donation
Donations for public use of cash, property or goods can also earn membership of the order. The class obtained is relative to the amount donated, as per the following table:

Selected recipients 
Anwar Chowdhry
Hernando de Soto Polar, economist
Galyani Vadhana, Thai princess
Ariya Jutanugarn, golfer
Pornthip Rojanasunand, doctor
Thaksin Shinawatra, politician
Eiji Toyoda, industrialist
 188 people involved in the Tham Luang cave rescue (114 foreigners including Elon Musk and 74 Thais)
 Min, prince

References

External links

 The Most Admirable Order of the Direkgunabhorn, Secretariat to the Cabinet of Thailand (archived 24 April 2008)

 
Direkgunabhorn, Order Of
Direkgunabhorn, Order Of
Direkgunabhorn, Order Of
1991 establishments in Thailand